An akamptisomer is a type of conformational isomer characterized by a hindered inversion of a bond angle. It was first discovered in 2018 in a series of bridged porphyrin molecules.

References 

Stereochemistry
Isomerism